Adi Raïs Cobos Adrien Ouahab M'Bolhi (born 25 April 1986), known as Raïs M'Bolhi, is a professional footballer who currently plays as a goalkeeper for Saudi First Division League club Al-Qadsiah. Born in France, he plays for the Algeria national team.

Club career

Early career
M'Bolhi, who has a Congolese father and an Algerian mother from Tlemcen, started playing football for RCF Paris. Then, he joined Olympique de Marseille, though he never made a league appearance before his release in January 2006.

After his release from Marseille, M'Bolhi was promptly recruited by Heart of Midlothian, one of 11 signings in the January transfer window. However, along with fellow new buys with Luděk Stracený and Martin Petras, he was not retained for the 2006–07 season and left the club without having made a first-team appearance.

Prior to the 2006–07 season M'Bolhi signed with Greek club Ethnikos Piraeus, then competing in Beta Ethniki. M'Bolhi made 5 appearances for Ethnikos before leaving in the winter transfer period for Greek club Panetolikos, then competing in Gamma Ethniki.

In 2008 M'Bolhi played 22 matches for F.C. Ryūkyū in Japan Football League.

Slavia Sofia
In May 2009, Bulgarian Slavia Sofia signed M'Bolhi to a two-year deal. He made his competitive debut for Slavia on 14 June 2009 against Lokomotiv Sofia. In January 2010, M'Bohli was named the 2009 Best Goalkeeper of A PFG. The fans organization of Slavia named him the best player of the 2009–2010 season.

On 6 May 2010, M'Bohli joined on a two-day trial with English champions Manchester United, but was ultimately not selected to play on the squad. On 23 June 2010, English club Newcastle United reportedly put in a bid for him for £1million.
On 22 July he was training with West Ham in their summer training camp in Germany.

CSKA Sofia loan
He was loaned out to CSKA Sofia on 30 August 2010, until the end of the year. After some unstable performance from Ivan Karadzhov and Zdravko Chavdarov, M'Bolhi was expected to be the first choice goalkeeper for the rest of the first half of the season and the group stage of UEFA Europa League and he indeed established himself as the main goalkeeper for the "redmen". M'Bolhi did not play against his parent team Slavia Sofia in the seventh round of the Bulgaria A PFG due to a special clause in the loan agreement.

Krylia Sovetov
On 16 December 2010, M'Bolhi was transferred to Russian side Krylia Sovetov Samara, signing a three-and-half-year contract. His debut came on 12 March 2011, in the 1–0 away loss against Spartak Nalchik, with the only goal being scored from the penalty spot. After the signing of Sergey Veremko, M'Bolhi found himself out of the first team.

CSKA Sofia loan
He was loaned out to CSKA Sofia for a second time on 2 August 2011, for a year, and was first choice for the team, but was then recalled by the Russian club. During the summer of 2012, M'Bolhi briefly returned to CSKA Sofia with the intention of signing a permanent contract with the team. However, he was deemed surplus to the requirements by the manager following the team's elimination from the UEFA Europa League by Slovenian club Mura 05 in late July 2012 (despite the Algerian not participating in these matches).

Gazélec Ajaccio loan
In mid January 2013, M'Bolhi was loaned out to Ligue 2 club Gazélec Ajaccio. He made his debut on 1 February 2013, in the 0–2 away loss against RC Lens. His team was relegated to the Championnat National at the end of the season and he rejoined CSKA Sofia in the summer of 2013, signing a three-year contract.

CSKA Sofia (third spell)
M'Bolhi was initially the third choice goalkeeper for the "armymen", but started to feature more often towards the end of 2013 after Tomáš Černý fell into disfavour. On 8 March 2014, M'Bolhi kept a clean sheet in the 1–0 win over Levski Sofia in The Eternal Derby, but was sent off in the closing minutes of the match after an altercation with Larsen Touré where M'Bolhi smashed the ball on Touré's head. He continued to be a regular for Algeria.

Philadelphia Union
On 30 July 2014, M'Bolhi was unveiled as a new signing of Major League Soccer club Philadelphia Union. M'Bohli had previously been linked to Trabzonspor, where he could have joined manager Vahid Halilhodžić and team-mate Carl Medjani.

However, his debut was delayed until 25 August (a 4–2 home win over San Jose Earthquakes) after he was involved in a car accident in Paris, France and had to resolve paperwork issues. M'Bolhi was presented with number 92 shirt for the club.

However, as of 8 April, M'Bolhi was benched by the Union's head coach, Jim Curtin, citing poor performance during the Philadelphia Union vs. Sporting Kansas City game on 5 April.

After playing in only nine matches in the 2015 season, head coach, Jim Curtin said that M'Bolhi would never play again for Philadelphia. M'Bolhi is rated as one of the worst signings in club history.

Antalyaspor
On 24 August 2015, M'Bolhi signed for Turkish club Antalyaspor.

Rennes
On 11 January 2017, M'Bolhi decided to sign a contract with French top flight club Stade Rennais, rejoining his former national team manager Christian Gourcuff.

Al-Ettifaq
On 19 January 2018, M'Bolhi joined Saudi Arabian club Al-Ettifaq on a six-month deal. On 6 March 2018, M'Bolhi renewed his contract with Al-Ettifaq until the end of the 2020–21 season. On 25 January 2019, M'Bolhi renewed his contract until 2022. On 30 June 2022, Al-Ettifaq announced that M'Bolhi had left the club following the expiration of his contract.

Al-Qadsiah
On 9 September 2022, M'Bolhi joined Saudi First Division League side Al-Qadsiah, reuniting with former manager Khaled Al-Atwi.

International career

He earned his first call-up to the France U-17 national team in November 2002 for a friendly match against England. In 2003, he was called up for two more friendlies against Portugal and the Czech Republic.

In June 2004, he received his first and only call-up to the France U-18 team for a friendly tournament in Salerno, Italy.

Subsequently, he was called up to the Algerian U-17 team but was not released by his club Olympique de Marseille.

On 28 May 2010, M'Bohli made his debut for Algeria in a 3–0 loss against the Republic of Ireland after coming on as a second-half substitute. He conceded one goal, a penalty scored by Robbie Keane. He made the 23-man Algerian squad for the 2010 FIFA World Cup, keeping a clean sheet and impressing in the goalless draw against England. However, he conceded a goal to Landon Donovan in the 91st minute of Algeria's 23 June match-up against the United States.

On 11 August 2010, M'Bolhi earned his fourth cap in a 1–2 friendly loss to Gabon.

He was also chosen as the starting goalkeeper for the first two games of the 2012 Africa Cup of Nations qualification and featured in 2014 World Cup qualification matches.

On 9 September 2012, M'Bolhi was a key player for Algeria in a 1–0 away win over Libya in a 2013 Africa Cup of Nations qualification match. He was the first choice custodian for the country during the 2013 Africa Cup of Nations.

M'Bolhi was Algeria's starting goalkeeper at the 2014 FIFA World Cup, where the Algerians managed to qualify to the knockout rounds for the first time in history. His performance in the round of 16 against Germany, with a total of 11 saves, helped push the game into overtime. Algeria eventually lost 2–1, but M'Bolhi earned man of the match honors.

M’Bolhi won his first title with Algeria at the 2019 Africa Cup of Nations. He was Algeria's starting goalkeeper as he started every game of Algeria's tournament winning run and played every minute of the competition for Algeria. Moreover, he was named as "Man of the Match" against Senegal in the Final and was named the best goalkeeper of the tournament.

Career statistics

Club

International

Honours
Heart of Midlothian
 Scottish Cup: 2005–06

Algeria
 Africa Cup of Nations: 2019
FIFA Arab Cup: 2021

Individual
 Best Algerian Goalkeeper : 2010, 2011, 2012 et 2014
 Best Goalkeeper of the Africa Cup of Nations: 2019
 CAF AFCON Team of the Tournament: 2019
 Saudi Professional League Player of the Month: September 2018
 Saudi Professional League Goalkeeper of the Month: November & December 2019, March 2020, March 2021
FIFA Arab Cup Golden Glove: 2021

References

External links
 
 
 
 
 

1986 births
Living people
Footballers from Paris
Algerian footballers
Algeria international footballers
French footballers
France youth international footballers
Algerian expatriate footballers
French expatriate footballers
Association football goalkeepers
Olympique de Marseille players
Heart of Midlothian F.C. players
Panetolikos F.C. players
Ethnikos Piraeus F.C. players
PFC Slavia Sofia players
PFC CSKA Sofia players
PFC Krylia Sovetov Samara players
FC Ryukyu players
Ettifaq FC players
Al-Qadsiah FC players
Philadelphia Union players
Expatriate footballers in Scotland
Expatriate footballers in Greece
Expatriate footballers in Japan
Expatriate footballers in Bulgaria
Expatriate footballers in Russia
Expatriate soccer players in the United States
Expatriate footballers in Saudi Arabia
Expatriate footballers in Turkey
Algerian expatriate sportspeople in Scotland
Algerian expatriate sportspeople in Greece
Algerian expatriate sportspeople in Japan
Algerian expatriate sportspeople in Bulgaria
Algerian expatriate sportspeople in Russia
Algerian expatriate sportspeople in the United States
Algerian expatriate sportspeople in Saudi Arabia
Algerian expatriate sportspeople in Turkey
Football League (Greece) players
First Professional Football League (Bulgaria) players
Saudi Professional League players
Saudi First Division League players
Russian Premier League players
Ligue 2 players
Major League Soccer players
Süper Lig players
2010 FIFA World Cup players
2013 Africa Cup of Nations players
2014 FIFA World Cup players
2015 Africa Cup of Nations players
2017 Africa Cup of Nations players
2019 Africa Cup of Nations players
2021 Africa Cup of Nations players
Algerian Muslims
French sportspeople of Algerian descent
French sportspeople of Democratic Republic of the Congo descent
French expatriate sportspeople in Bulgaria
Algerian people of Democratic Republic of the Congo descent
Black French sportspeople